Cory Gene Raymer (born March 3, 1973) is a former American college and professional football player who was a center in the National Football League (NFL) for eleven seasons.  Raymer played college football for the University of Wisconsin, and was honored as an All-American.  A second-round pick in the 1995 NFL Draft, he played professionally for the Washington Redskins and San Diego Chargers of the NFL.

Early years
Raymer was born in Fond du Lac, Wisconsin.  He attended Goodrich High School in Fond du Lac, and was a USA Today All-America honorable mention selection and earned first-team all-state honors as a defensive tackle.

College career
Raymer attended the University of Wisconsin–Madison, where he played for the Wisconsin Badgers football team from 1991 to 1994.  As a senior in 1994, he was recognized as a unanimous first-team All-American at center. He was Wisconsin's first consensus All-American since Tim Krumrie in 1981.  Raymer was also one of 12 nominees for the 1994 Lombardi Award, which is awarded to college football's top lineman.  He graduated from Wisconsin with a bachelor's degree in letters and sciences.

Professional career
In , while returning home from a fishing trip, a car crossed his path. In an attempt to avoid the car, Raymer turned over his vehicle and suffered a bruised kidney, fractured vertebra and badly sprained left shoulder. This would cause him to miss the rest of the season and put his NFL career in jeopardy. However, Raymer played six games the following season and started three after Jeff Uhlenhake was sidelined.

The 1998 season marked the first time Raymer started all 16 games in an NFL season.  He took the snap in all but one of the 1,029 offensive plays.  Again in 1999 Raymer started all 16 games and also playoff games.  He was a fixture on the Redskins' offensive line, composed of Keith Sims and Tre Johnson at guard, Andy Heck and Jon Jansen at tackle, the NFL's second-ranked offense that season with 443 points (27.7 points/game), with Brad Johnson at quarterback. In a wild card game of the 1999-00 NFL playoffs, Washington defeated the Detroit Lions, rushing for a massive 223 yards, as the interior line bowled over defensive tackles James Jones (defensive lineman) and Luther Elliss with middle linebacker Stephen Boyd. But the Redskins lost to the Tampa Bay Buccaneers in the divisional round. The 2000 season was a setback for Raymer, suffering a torn ACL in practice and reinjuring his knee a month later, again in practice.  This led to Raymer being placed on the injured reserve and missing the entire season, not playing in a single game, replaced at starting center by Mark Fischer. But Raymer bounced back again in 2001 by starting in all 16 games in an 8-8 won-lost season.

Raymer then went on to play for the San Diego Chargers in 2002, while Larry Moore became the starting center for Washington. But Raymer but suffered a season-ending Achilles injury just three games into the season. The following year, Raymer again bounced back and played in 15 games, starting eight.

On March 11, 2004, Raymer returned to the Redskins by signing as a free agent, when he appeared in 15 games and started 14 in a 6-10 season. In 2005, he lost his starting job to free agent Casey Rabach, but he did see action in two regular games and also against the Seattle Seahawks in the divisional playoff game. After the season ended, he retired from football.

References

External links

Profile at Redskins.com

1973 births
Living people
All-American college football players
American football centers
Sportspeople from Fond du Lac, Wisconsin
Players of American football from Wisconsin
San Diego Chargers players
Washington Redskins players
Wisconsin Badgers football players
Ed Block Courage Award recipients